Setosellidae is a family of bryozoans belonging to the order Cheilostomatida.

Genera:
 Lagarozoum  	 
 Setosella Hincks, 1877

References

Cheilostomatida